Mee rebus, also known as mie rebus/mi rebus in Indonesian spelling, is a Maritime Southeast Asian noodle soup dish. Literally translated as "boiled noodles", it is popular in Maritime Southeast Asian countries such as Indonesia, Malaysia, and Singapore. In Indonesia it is also known as mie kuah, which literally means "noodle soup".

Similar dishes 
In certain areas, a similar variety of Mee rebus is called Mie Jawa, Mee Jawa, Mi Jawa, Bakmi Jawa or Bakmi Godhog, although this is a popular misnomer, since Mie Jawa is slightly different from Mi Rebus. Despite sharing similar spices, Mie Jawa contains chicken instead of shrimp. A dish similar to Mi Rebus in Indonesia is called Mie Celor, and it is popular in Palembang. Batam islands has a version called Mi Lendir.

See also 

 Mie goreng
 Mie ayam
 Mie Aceh
 Mie celor
 Kwetiau goreng

References 

Culture of Indian diaspora
Indian-Malaysian culture
Indonesian noodle dishes
Malaysian noodle dishes
Singaporean noodle dishes
Cocossian cuisine